Capitol Pride is an annual event and non-profit organization based in Salem, Oregon, in the United States. Founded in 2004, its mission is to "promote understanding and education regarding LGBTQ issues, and to foster a sense of community for these individuals and their supporters in Salem and the Mid-Willamette Valley of Oregon."

References

External links

 
 Events: Capitol Pride, 30 Year Anniversary! by Laura Calvo (July 26, 2008), Stonewall Oregon: Democratic Party of Oregon GLBT Caucus
 Salem’s got Pride (2012), WillametteLive.com
 Capitol Pride (August 8, 2012), PQ Monthly
 Gayest Cities in America, 2013 by Matthew Breen (January 9, 2013), The Advocate

2004 establishments in Oregon
Annual events in Oregon
Culture of Salem, Oregon
LGBT events in Oregon
LGBT organizations in the United States
Non-profit organizations based in Oregon
Organizations based in Salem, Oregon
Organizations established in 2004
Festivals established in 2004